Ablabera capicola is a species of beetle discovered by Louis Péringuey in 1904. No sub-species are listed in the Catalogue of Life.

References

Melolonthinae
Beetles described in 1904